In the run up to the next Portuguese legislative election, various organisations will carry out opinion polling to gauge voting intention in Portugal. Results of such polls are displayed in this article. The date range for these opinion polls are from the 2022 Portuguese legislative election, held on 30 January, to the present day.

Nationwide polling

Graphical summary

Polling

Poll results are listed in the table below in reverse chronological order, showing the most recent first. The highest percentage figure in each polling survey is displayed in bold, and the background shaded in the leading party's colour. In the instance that there is a tie, parties are shaded with their colour. The lead column on the right shows the percentage-point difference between the two parties with the highest figures. Poll results use the date the survey's fieldwork was done, as opposed to the date of publication.

Hypothetical scenarios

Jorge Moreira da Silva as PSD leader

Luís Montenegro as PSD leader

Luís Montenegro as PSD leader and Nuno Melo as CDS-PP leader

Leadership polls

Preferred Prime Minister
Poll results showing public opinion on who would make the best Prime Minister are shown in the table below in reverse chronological order, showing the most recent first.

António Costa vs Luís Montenegro

Leaders' ratings
Poll results showing the public opinion on all political party leaders rated from 0 (the worse) to 10 (the best) are shown in the table below in reverse chronological order, showing the most recent first.

Cabinet approval/disapproval ratings

Graphical summary

Polling
Poll results showing public opinion on the performance of the Government are shown in the table below in reverse chronological order, showing the most recent first.

Notes

References

External links 
 Marktest Opinion Poll Tracker
 ERC - Official publication of polls
 Average of polls and seat simulator

Opinion polling in Portugal
Portugal